Jarząbkowice  is a village in the administrative district of Gmina Pawłowice, within Pszczyna County, Silesian Voivodeship, in southern Poland.

The village has a population of 627.

The village was first mentioned in a Latin document of Diocese of Wrocław called Liber fundationis episcopatus Vratislaviensis from around 1305 as item Geranczcovitz. The creation of the village was a part of a larger settlement campaign taking place in the late 13th century on the territory of what will be later known as Upper Silesia.

References

Villages in Pszczyna County